Michele Rinaldi (born 28 June 1991) is an Italian footballer.

In 2012, he was signed by Lega Pro Seconda Divisione club Chieti.

References

External links
 AIC profile (data by football.it)

Italian footballers
Giulianova Calcio players
S.S. Chieti Calcio players
Serie C players
Association football midfielders
1991 births
Living people
A.S.D. Città di Giulianova 1924 players